Cranberry is an unincorporated community in Hazle Township, Luzerne County, Pennsylvania, United States.

Notes

Unincorporated communities in Luzerne County, Pennsylvania
Unincorporated communities in Pennsylvania